Live at the Royal Festival Hall may refer to:

 Live at the Royal Festival Hall (Neil Sedaka album), 1974
 Live at the Royal Festival Hall (Glen Campbell album), 1977
 Live at the Royal Festival Hall (Jaki Byard and Howard Riley album), 1984
 Live at the Royal Festival Hall (John McLaughlin Trio album), recorded 1989 and released 1990
 Live at the Royal Festival Hall (Dizzy Gillespie album), 1989

See also
 Royal Festival Hall Live – June 10th 2001, an album by Roy Harper